Lianmuqin is a town in Shanshan County, Xinjiang. It is located on China National Highway 312 about 20 km west of Shanshan Town (Shanshan County's county seat), on the way to Turpan.

Located in the northern foothills of the Flaming Mountains, Lianmuqin is known for a number of paleontological finds. The Lianmuqin Formation is named after it, and the Subashi Formation, after the nearby village of Subashi, which, however, is part not of Lianmuqin Town but of Tuyugou Township (吐峪沟乡).

Populated places in Xinjiang